"Blue Clear Sky" is a song written by Bob DiPiero, John Jarrard and Mark D. Sanders, and performed by American country music singer George Strait.  It was released in March 1996 as the first single and title track from Strait's album of the same name.  "Blue Clear Sky" was recorded in Nashville, Tennessee at Emerald Studios.  The song reached Number One on the Billboard Hot Country Singles & Tracks (now Hot Country Songs) charts.

Background
Strait told Billboard that he loved the song when he first heard it, but he was also concerned. "I thought that 'Blue Clear Sky' didn't sound right to me, it should have been 'Clear Blue Sky.' Tony and I talked about it, and we came so close to messing it up. We finally called Bob DiPiero [one of the song's writers], and he said he got the line from Forrest Gump. Bob DiPiero writes in the GAC (Great American Country) featured article, Bob DiPiero Reveals The Story Behind "Blue Clear Sky" about the idea of the song. Bob says, "I went to see the movie "Forrest Gump." About halfway through the movie, Forest has a dialogue where he is talking about his girlfriend, Jenny. The dialogue went something like this...
 
"Jenny was gone, then all of a sudden, out of the blue clear sky, she was back."
 
Well, of course it's backwards. The real term is "out of the clear blue sky," but it grabbed my attention. The next day I was writing with John Jarrard and Mark D. Sanders. I told them about this backwards idea and we wrote "Blue Clear Sky" about how love seems unfindable and then out of the blue, you find it."

Critical reception
Deborah Evans Price, of Billboard magazine reviewed the song favorably, saying "that readily identifiable, likeable, warm Texas voice totally sells this sweet song about the joys of finding love." She discusses the "catchy, melodic introduction to the steel guitar weaving throughout this lively uptempo number." Her review was well received despite Erv Woolsey's (Erv Woolsey Talent Agency) statement, "He's [George Strait] becoming an event, and all he does is stand up there and sing", which may suggest that Strait could be seen as inactive up on stage.<ref>Billboard, April 20, 1996</ref>

Chart performance
"Blue Clear Sky" debuted at number 41 on the U.S. Billboard'' Hot Country Singles & Tracks for the week of April 6, 1996.

Year-end charts

Certifications

References

1996 singles
1996 songs
George Strait songs
Songs written by Bob DiPiero
Song recordings produced by Tony Brown (record producer)
Songs written by John Jarrard
Songs written by Mark D. Sanders
MCA Records singles